Vărzărești is a commune in Nisporeni District, Moldova. It is composed of two villages, Șendreni and Vărzărești.

Notable people 
 Ovidiu Creangă
 Valentina Ursu

Gallery

References

Communes of Nisporeni District